The 2015 Memphis mayoral election took place on October 8, 2015 to elect the Mayor of Memphis, Tennessee. The mayoral election coincided with elections for the thirteen seats on the Memphis City Council. 

The election was officially nonpartisan, with all candidates running together, regardless of party.  Due to the 1991 ruling of U.S. District Judge Jerome Turner, there is no runoff allowed in citywide elections.

Incumbent Democratic Mayor A C Wharton ran for re-election to a second full term in office. He was defeated by Memphis City Councilman Jim Strickland, a fellow Democrat, who earned a plurality of the vote and became the first White mayor of Memphis in more than two decades.

Candidates

Democratic Party

Declared
 Harold Collins, Memphis City Councillor
 Jim Strickland, Chairman of the Memphis City Council
 A C Wharton, incumbent Mayor
 Mike Williams, President of the Memphis Police Association

Potential/Withdrew
 Steve Basar, Shelby County Commissioner
 Carol Chumney, former State Representative, former Memphis City Councillor and candidate for Mayor in 2007 and 2009
Justin Ford, Shelby County Commissioner and member of the Ford family
Detric Golden, former University of Memphis basketball player
James Harvey, former Shelby County Commissioner and candidate for Mayor in 2011
 Kenneth Whalum, minister, former School Board member, candidate for Mayor in 2011 and candidate for Mayor of Shelby County in 2014

Declined
 Edmund Ford Sr., Memphis City Councillor and candidate for Mayor in 2011
 Myron Lowery, Memphis City Councillor, former Mayor pro tempore and candidate for Mayor in 2009
Jason Smith, State Senator and President of Smith Property Group

General Election 
A C Wharton was first elected Mayor of Memphis in a 2009 special election following the resignation of Mayor Willie Herenton; he was elected to a full term in 2011. As mayor, Wharton oversaw the city's response to the 2009 recession and subsequent budget cuts. 

Wharton defended his record as mayor, but faced criticism from his challengers on Memphis' high crime rates, slow economic growth, and Wharton's benefits cuts to city workers. Strickland painted himself as a "law and order" candidate and promised to crack down on violent crime in the city, while Harold Collins called for a data-based approach to crime and for increased job training for Memphis residents.

On Election Day, Strickland defeated Wharton by nearly twenty percentage points, winning a plurality of the vote.

References

External links
Official campaign websites
 Harold Collins for Mayor
 James Harvey for Mayor
 Mike Williams for Mayor

2015 Tennessee elections
Memphis
Government of Memphis, Tennessee